George Patrick Benson (called Paddy; born 26 June 1949 in Derby) is an Anglican priest; he was Archdeacon of Hereford from 2011 until his retirement in the summer of 2018.

Benson was educated at Bemrose School, Leighton Park School and Christ Church, Oxford (he graduated in 1970 with a Bachelor of Arts {BA} degree). He was an Editorial Assistant then Director of Academic Studies at St Andrew's College, Kabare in Kenya. He trained for ordination at Trinity College, Bristol and was ordained  in 1992. After a curacy at St Mary Upton, Wirral he was Vicar of  Christ Church, Barnston, Wirral  until his appointment as Archdeacon of Hereford. His retirement was announced in 2017, effective in August 2018.

References

1949 births
People from Derby
People educated at Bemrose School
Alumni of Christ Church, Oxford
Alumni of Trinity College, Bristol
Archdeacons of Hereford
Living people